Tolpia kampungi is a moth of the family Erebidae first described by Michael Fibiger in 2007. It is known from the Malaysian state of Pahang.

The wingspan is 14–16 mm. The hindwing is short and dark brown. The underside is unicolorous brown.

References

External links
 

Micronoctuini
Taxa named by Michael Fibiger
Moths described in 2007